The Algonquin Gas Transmission Pipeline is a  long pipeline system, which delivers natural gas to New England. It is connected to the Texas Eastern Pipeline and the Maritimes & Northeast Pipeline. The Algonquin Gas Transmission pipelines transport about 20 billion cubic meters (bcm) of natural gas per annum.  It generally receives gas that originated in the Gulf of Mexico, although it also receives gas from an LNG terminal in Massachusetts.  The Algonquin Gas Transmission is owned by Enbridge. The pipeline's compressor station in Weymouth, Massachusetts has had multiple unplanned gas releases since September 2020.

See also
Horizon Pipeline

References

External links
Algonquin Gas Transmission Spectra Energy Profile
Pipeline Electronic Bulletin Board
Pipeline and Hazardous Materials Safety Administration  Operator Report and Incidents Report

Natural gas pipelines in the United States
Energy in New England
Enbridge pipelines